Hart Almerrin Massey (April 29, 1823 – February 20, 1896) was a Canadian businessman and philanthropist who was a member of the prominent Massey family. He was an industrialist who built the agricultural equipment firm that became Massey Ferguson, now part of AGCO.

Life and career

Massey was born in Haldimand Township (now Alnwick/Haldimand, Ontario) in what was then known as Upper Canada. His parents were both American, Daniel Massey and Lucina Bradley. Hart held dual Canadian and United States citizenship. The doorstep of the original Massey homestead can still be found behind the current farmhouse on the farm, which remains in the Massey family.

The Massey Manufacturing Co. had been founded by his father, Daniel Massey. In 1851, Hart joined the company and became the sole owner in 1856 upon his father's death. He moved it from rural Newcastle to the city of Toronto in the 1870s. He expanded the company's market to Argentina, Australia, and Europe in the 1880s. Hart had planned to retire and pass the company to his son, Charles; however, Charles died of typhoid in 1884 forcing Hart to return to managing the company. During this period, he oversaw Massey Manufacturing merging with the Harris firm. The company was renamed Massey-Harris. Another merger was made with Patterson-Wisner Company leaving Massey-Harris with 60% of the Canadian agricultural equipment market.

Marriage and children
On June 10, 1847, he married Eliza Ann Phelps. They had a daughter and five sons, one of whom died in infancy.

Their four surviving sons were Charles Albert (1848–1884), Chester Daniel (1850–1926), Walter Edward Hart Massey (1864–1901; he used to own the land which Crescent Town now resides on) and Frederick Victor (1867–1890), who collectively carried on the family business as well as its multiple cultural and charitable interests.

Massey's daughter, Lillian Frances Treble (1854–1915), was a philanthropist and educator. Members of the next generation included his grandsons Vincent Massey, who became Governor General of Canada, and actor Raymond Massey.

Death and legacy
He died in Toronto in 1896 and was buried in Mount Pleasant Cemetery. Charitable gifts in his will led to the creation of the Massey Foundation, whose first major project was the completion of a student centre for the University of Toronto, which was given the name of Hart House. His estate funded the Burwash Hall men's residence at Victoria University.

The foundation also contributed to Massey Hall, a cultural landmark in Toronto, and more recently endowed Massey College at the University of Toronto. Massey was also a member of the Freemasons.

References

 

 

1823 births
1896 deaths
Hart Massey
Businesspeople from Ontario
People from Northumberland County, Ontario
Persons of National Historic Significance (Canada)
19th-century Canadian philanthropists